Fiestas patronales de Ponce is an annual cultural celebration held at Plaza Las Delicias in Ponce, Puerto Rico. The celebration, which commonly lasts three days, takes place in late December. Ponce's Fiestas patronales are heavily influenced by Spanish culture and religion, and are a tradition held in honor of the city's patron saint, the Virgen of Guadalupe. As such the celebration may be as old as the town itself (1692). The festivities usually include religious processions honoring its Catholic heritage. However, elements of African and local culture have been incorporated as well. They also feature parades, games, artisans, amusement rides, regional food, and live entertainment. It is attended mostly by people from the city of Ponce and its 18 surrounding barrios, but also people from all over Puerto Rico. The free event's attendance is estimated in the hundreds every day.

Contents and purpose
Fiestas patronales de Ponce is organized and held by the government of the municipality of Ponce. The cost of the event to the municipality is around $30,000. Fiestas patronales de Ponce aim to celebrate a cultural tradition while also strengthening family bonds, provide a venue to enhance community ties, and keep local traditions alive. They typically brings together over 100 artists, including some 10 music bands, choreographed dancers, plus the thousands of locals who join in. This celebration has been described as a "townspeople feast." Besides music, dance and food, Fiestas patronales de Ponce also features amusement rides, artisans, cheerleaders, jugglers, and arts and crafts, among other attractions.

List of events
 
Fiestas patronales are usually preceded by the lighting of the downtown Ponce Christmas decorations and the Nativity scene at the Ponce City Hall in early December. This kickoff event is frequently attended by the Mayor of Ponce. This kickoff is also traditionally the unofficial precursor for the opening of Christmas-time season kiosk shops at Plaza Las Delicias, a tradition that has taken place since at least the middle of the 20th century. Fiestas patronales de Ponce usually start on a Friday. The following is the list of events for the 2019 Fiestas patronales, which are typical of the other years.

Friday: 

9:00 a.m. – 2:00 p.m.: Victoria Sanabria: Trovando por tu salud con redes del Sureste
6:00 p.m. – 7:00 p.m.: Ricardo Jesús y su orquesta
7:00 p.m. – 8:00 p.m.: Academia Julie Mayoral
8:00 p.m. – 9:00 p.m.: Ballet Señorial
9:30 p.m. – 10:30 p.m.: Jíbara Banda
11:00 p.m. – 12:30 a.m.: Moncho Rivera

Saturday:

5:30 p.m. – 7:00 p.m.: Instituto de Música Juan Morel Campos
7:00 p.m. – 8:00 p.m.: Catholic Mass
8:00 p.m. – 9:00 p.m.: Live to Dance Academy
9:30 p.m. – 10:30 p.m.: Raúl Armando “El Rau”
11:00 p.m. – 12:30 a.m.: Kevvo

Sunday:

5:00 a.m.: Maratón de La Guadalupe
2:00 p.m. – 3:00 p.m.: The Magnific Dragon
3:00 p.m. – 4:00 p.m.: Payaso Remi
4:00 p.m. – 5:00 p.m.: Catholic Mass
5:30 p.m. – 6:30 p.m.: Centenaria Banda Municipal de Ponce
7:00 p.m. – 8:00 p.m.: Catholic Mass
8:30 p.m. – 9:30 p.m.: Hermanos Sanabria
9:30 p.m. – 9:45 p.m.: Ballet Salsa Sur
10:00 p.m. – 11:00 p.m.: La Sonora Ponceña

See also
 Fiestas patronales in Puerto Rico
 Feria de Artesanías de Ponce
 Ponce Jazz Festival
 Fiesta Nacional de la Danza
 Día Mundial de Ponce
 Festival Nacional de la Quenepa
 Bienal de Arte de Ponce
 Festival de Bomba y Plena de San Antón
 Carnaval de Vejigantes

References

External links 
 Ramon Marin. Las Fiestas Populares de Ponce. Editorial Universidad de Puerto Rico. 1994. 

Carnivals in Puerto Rico
Festivals in Ponce, Puerto Rico
Events in Ponce, Puerto Rico
Patronal festivals in Puerto Rico